USA-211, or Wideband Global SATCOM 3 (WGS-3) is a United States military communications satellite operated by the United States Air Force as part of the Wideband Global SATCOM programme. Launched in 2009, it was the third WGS satellite, and final Block I satellite, to reach orbit. It is stationed at 12° West (Atlantic Ocean) in geostationary orbit.

Overview 
The WGS system is a constellation of highly capable military communications satellites that leverage cost-effective methods and technological advances in the communications satellite industry. The WGS system is composed of three principal segments: Space Segment (satellites), Control Segment (operators) and Terminal Segment (users). Each WGS satellite provides service in multiple frequency bands, with the unprecedented ability to cross-band between the two frequencies on board the satellite. WGS augments other satellites.

In early 2001, a satellite communications industry team led by Boeing Satellite Systems was selected to develop the Wideband Gapfiller Satellite (WGS) system as successors to the Defense Satellite Communications System (DSCS) series of communications satellites. This satellite communications system is intended to support the warfighter with newer and far greater capabilities than provided by current systems. In March 2007, the acronym WGS was changed to Wideband Global SATCOM.

Just one WGS satellite provides more SATCOM capacity than the entire legacy Defense Satellite Communications System (DSCS) constellation.

Satellite description 
Built by Boeing Satellite Systems, WGS-3 is based on the BSS-702 satellite bus. The satellite is equipped with two solar arrays to generate power for its communications payload, which consists of cross-band X-band and Ka-band transponders. Propulsion is provided by a R-4D-15 apogee motor, with four XIPS-25 ion engines for stationkeeping.

Launch 
WGS-3 was launched by United Launch Alliance (ULA), who placed it into orbit using a Delta IV launch vehicle, which flew for the first time in the Medium+ (5,4) configuration. The launch took place from Space Launch Complex 37B (SLC-37B) at the Cape Canaveral Air Force Station (CCAFS), with at 01:47:00 UTC on 6 December 2009. The launch was successful, placing the satellite into a geostationary transfer orbit (GTO), from which it raised itself into geostationary orbit using its propulsion system. Following launch, the satellite was designated USA-211 under the U.S. military's designation system, and received the International Designator 2009-068A and Satellite Catalog Number 36108.

References 

Spacecraft launched in 2009
USA satellites
Wideband Global SATCOM
Communications satellites in geostationary orbit